Cooloola is a genus of ensiferan orthopterans known as Cooloola monsters. It is the only genus in the subfamily Cooloolinae and family Cooloolidae of the superfamily Stenopelmatoidea.

Four species are known from this family, all endemic to Queensland, Australia. The name originated from the discovery of the best-known member of the family, the Cooloola monster (Cooloola propator), in the Cooloola National Park.

Little is known about their life histories as they lead an almost entirely subterranean existence, but  they are believed to prey on other soil-dwelling invertebrates.  Cooloola monsters are unusual in comparison with other members of the primitive superfamily Stenopelmatoidea in that the cooloolids' antennae are considerably shorter than their body lengths.

Classification
While often treated as a family, molecular evidence suggests that cooloolids are in fact aberrant members of the family Anostostomatidae, and the genus Cooloola may not be monophyletic.

Species include:
Cooloola dingo Rentz, 1986 – dingo monster
Cooloola pearsoni Rentz, 1999 – Pearson's monster
Cooloola propator Rentz, 1980 – Cooloola monster
Cooloola ziljan Rentz, 1986 – sugarcane monster

References

Grasshopper Country: The Abundant Orthopteroid Insects of Australia, by David C. Rentz. 1995.

External links
Species synopses by the Australian Department of the Environment and Heritage

Stenopelmatoidea
Ensifera genera
Orthoptera of Australia